Parideae is a tribe of flowering plants in the family Melanthiaceae.

Taxonomy
Parideae was named by Friedrich Gottlieb Bartling in 1830. At the time, Bartling placed four genera in tribe Parideae: Myrsiphyllum , Medeola , Trillium , and Paris . , Myrsiphyllum is a synonym for Asparagus  and Medeola is a member of tribe Medeoleae in the family Liliaceae. The type genus for tribe Parideae is Paris.

Subdivisions
, Parideae includes the following genera:

 Paris  (including Daiswa and Kinugasa)
 Pseudotrillium 
 Trillium  (including Trillidium)

Some authorities accept all six genera listed above.

See also
 Trilliaceae

References

Taxa named by Friedrich Gottlieb Bartling
Melanthiaceae
Monocot tribes